The 1972 Pittsburgh Steelers season was the team's 40th in the National Football League.

It was the Steelers' third-ever postseason appearance, first in ten seasons (the Playoff Bowl for third place in the league), and only its second playoff game since 1947. This season is famous for the Immaculate Reception, where the Steelers beat the Oakland Raiders 13–7 in the playoffs on a last second touchdown by rookie running back Franco Harris.

The rebuilding of the franchise that began in 1969 with the hiring of head coach Chuck Noll finally came to fruition in his fourth year. After winning only once in that first season, the Steelers then showed steady improvement. They broke through in 1972 and made the playoffs for the first time since 1947; their three losses were by a combined eleven points. The division title was the first in team history, as was the appearance in the AFC Championship game which they lost to the undefeated Miami Dolphins 21–17. It was the first of eight consecutive playoff appearances for the Steelers that led to four Super Bowl championships.

Offseason

NFL Draft

Roster

Depth chart

Staff

•Lionel Taylor - Receiver Coach

•Charlie Sumner - Linebacker Coach

•             - Quarterback Coach

•Dick Hoak - Defensive Backfield Coach

•Bud Carson - Defensive Backfield Coach

•Bob Fry - Offensive Line Coach

•Lou Riecke - Strength Coach

•George Perles - Defensive Line Coach

Regular season

Schedule

Game summaries

Week 1: vs. Oakland Raiders 

 References: 
    
    
    
    
    
    
    
    
    
    

The Steelers were able to start off against the Raiders at home scoring 17 unanswered points (2TDs/PATs and a FG) and eventually ended up defeating the team by 6 for a 34–28 victory and a 1–0 start.

Week 2: at Cincinnati Bengals 

References:

Week 3: at St. Louis Cardinals 

References:

Week 4: at Dallas Cowboys 

References:

Week 5: vs. Houston Oilers 

References:

Week 6: vs. New England Patriots 

References:

Week 7: at Buffalo Bills 

References:

Week 8: vs. Cincinnati Bengals 

References:

Week 9: vs. Kansas City Chiefs 

References: 

Scoring drives:

 Kansas City – Kearney 65 interception return (Stenerud kick) – Chiefs 7–0
 Pittsburgh – FG Gerela 25 – Chiefs 7–3
 Pittsburgh – FG Gerela 10 – Chiefs 7–6
 Pittsburgh – FG Gerela 49 – Steelers 9–7
 Pittsburgh – Harris 7 run (Gerela kick) – Steelers 16–7

Week 10: Cleveland Browns 

References: 

Scoring drives:

 Pittsburgh – FG Gerela 39 – Steelers 3–0
 Cleveland – FG Cockroft 26 – Tie 3–3
 Cleveland – Phipps 1 run (Cockroft kick) – Browns 10–3
 Cleveland – FG Cockroft 38 – Browns 13–3
 Cleveland – Pitts 17 pass from Phipps (Cockroft kick) – Browns 20–3
 Pittsburgh – Mullins  3 pass from Bradshaw (Gerela kick) – Browns 20–10
 Cleveland – FG Cockroft 12 – Browns 23–10
 Pittsburgh – Fuqua 1 run (Gerela kick) – Browns 23–17
 Pittsburgh – Harris 75 run (Gerela kick)- Steelers 24–23
 Cleveland – FG Cockroft 26 – Browns 26–24

Week 11: vs. Minnesota Vikings

Week 12: vs. Cleveland Browns 

References: 

Franco Harris breaks Jim Brown's record for consecutive 100 yd games.

Scoring drives:

 Pittsburgh – FG Gerela 19 – Steelers 3–0
 Pittsburgh – Harris 1 run (Gerela kick) – Steelers 10–0
 Pittsburgh – Harris 11 run (Gerela kick) – Steelers 17–0
 Pittsburgh – McMakin 78 pass from Bradshaw (Gerela kick) – Steelers 24–0
 Pittsburgh – FG Gerela 44 – Steelers 27–0
 Pittsburgh – FG Gerela 37 – Steelers 30–0

Week 13: at Houston Oilers 

Scoring drives:

 Pittsburgh – FG Gerela 24 – Steelers 3–0
 Houston – FG Butler 34 – Tie 3–3
 Pittsburgh – FG Gerela 39 – Steelers 6–3
 Pittsburgh – FG Gerela 13 – Steelers 9–3
Steelers clinch their 1st playoff berth.

Week 14: San Diego Chargers 

References: 

The Pittsburgh Steelers clinched their first AFC Central Division title. The day before the game Frank Sinatra is inducted into Franco's Italian Army.

Scoring drives:
 Pittsburgh – Harris 7 yd run (Gerela kick) Steelers 7-0
 San Diego – Safety, Costa tackled Bradshaw in end zone – Steelers 7-2
 Pittsburgh – Fuqua 2 run (Gerela kick) – Steelers 14–2
 Pittsburgh – FG Gerela 24 – Steelers 17–2
 Pittsburgh – Shanklin  17 pass from Bradshaw (Gerela kick) – Steelers 24–2

Standings

Postseason

Game summaries

AFC Divisional: vs. Oakland Raiders

AFC Championship: vs. Miami Dolphins 

 PIT – Mullins recovered fumble in end zone (Gerela kick) PIT 7–0
 MIA – Csonka 9 pass from Morrall (Yepremian kick) 7–7
 PIT – FG Gerela 14 11:00 3rd PIT 10–7 
 MIA – Kiick 2 run (Yepremian kick) MIA 14–10
 MIA – Kiick 3 run (Yepremian kick) MIA 21–10
 PIT – Young 12 pass from Bradshaw (Gerela kick) MIA 21–17

References

External links
 1972 Pittsburgh Steelers season at Profootballreference.com 
 1972 Pittsburgh Steelers season statistics at jt-sw.com 

Pittsburgh Steelers seasons
Pittsburgh Steelers
AFC Central championship seasons
Pittsburgh Steel